The Ötztal Alps are a mountain range in the Central Eastern Alps, in the State of Tyrol in western Austria and the Province of South Tyrol in northern Italy.

Geography
The Ötztal Alps are arrayed at the head of the Ötztal valley, a side valley of the Inn river southwest of Innsbruck, Austria. One line of summits forms part of the border between Austria and Italy.

The Ötztal Alps are bordered by the Reschen Pass (1504 m) in the west and the Inn river in the northwest and north. In the east the range is separated from the Stubai Alps by the Ötztaler Ache in the Ötztal, the Timmelsjoch (2474 m) and the Passer river in the Passeier Valley. On the south and southwest, the range is limited by the deep valley of the Etsch river, here known as the Vinschgau.

The Ötztal Alps are surrounded by the following ranges:
 Lechtal Alps
 Mieming Range
 Stubai Alps
 Sarntal Alps
 Ortler Alps
 Sesvenna Alps
 Samnaun Alps

On September 1991, Ötzi the so-called "Iceman" was found on the Hauslabjoch between the peaks Fineilspitze and Similaun.

Peaks

The highest point of the Ötztal Alps is Wildspitze , which is also the second highest mountain in Austria (after Großglockner). Wildspitze is on one of several arms that extend north and northeast from the main ridge.

Some of the main peaks of the Ötztal Alps are:

Passes

The main mountain passes of the Ötztal Alps are:

See also 

 Banker Kirchenkogel
 Geography of the Alps

 
Rhaetian Alps
Mountain ranges of the Alps
Mountain ranges of Trentino
Mountain ranges of Tyrol (state)
Mountain ranges of Italy